Åstol is a locality situated south of Tjörn Municipality (close to Marstrand), Västra Götaland County, Sweden with 210 inhabitants in 2010.

References 

Populated places in Västra Götaland County
Populated places in Tjörn Municipality